Corynebacterium macginleyi is a species of bacteria with type strain JCL-2 (CIP 104099). It is considered pathogenic.

References

Further reading

External links
 
 LPSN
 Type strain of Corynebacterium macginleyi at BacDive -  the Bacterial Diversity Metadatabase

Corynebacterium
Gram-positive bacteria
Bacteria described in 1995